Mok Hing Ling is a Chinese modern ink painting artist. The alterations of nature are a major theme in Mok's works. Her technique employs a brush-like sponge as the portrayal tool to get certain natural results. Her depiction of nature in her painting makes this abundantly obvious.

In 1973, Mok settled in Hong Kong and started her art career. She concentrated on Chinese ink wash painting under Ding Yanyong in the 1970s, and later Cheung Kwan-sut. She has spent more than twenty years honing her Chinese ink painting skills. She appears in a fusion of many painting techniques that combines conventional painting techniques with modern materials and brushstrokes. The majority of her works are landscapes. Usually, she uses her drawings to show her gratitude to nature. In 1981 and 1983, Mok participated in the Contemporary Hong Kong Art Biennial Exhibition. Additionally, her works were shown in other collaborative exhibits in Australia, Philippines, Japan, Taiwan, Malaysia, China, and Russia. During the 1990s, her solo exhibitions started to launch in Hong Kong and Canada. Her paintings have once been selected in the 2nd Contemporary Chinese Landscape Painting Exhibition in 1993 and "The 9th National Art Exhibition with a Showcase of Selected Works by Hong Kong, Macau and Taiwanese Artists". She also got an award of the third honor of "Youthful Artist in China" in 1994. Her paintings have also been collected by Taiwan Museum of Art, Jiangsu Provincial Art Museum, Hubei Provincial Museum of Art, He Xiangning Art Museum, and other investors. Mok was once a member of the Hong Kong Modern Ink Painting Society but she faded out in 2005.

Some of Mok's exhibited artworks are as follow:

References

 Mok Hing Ling. (2015, May 19). Retrieved from http://finearts.hku.hk/hkaa/revamp2011/artist_view.php?artist_id=044
 Mok Hing Ling's Artworks. (2012, June 5). Retrieved from http://www.aaa.org.hk/Collection/Search?peopleID=5566
 History of HKMIPS. Retrieved from https://sites.google.com/site/hkmips/
 Chinese Inking Paintings Exhibition by Mok Hing-ling. (2000, March 15). Retrieved from http://www.info.gov.hk/gia/general/200003/15/0315226.htm
 Collections of 1978. Retrieved from https://web.archive.org/web/20161113114841/http://collectionweb.ntmofa.gov.tw/tw2/year_works.aspx?y=078&a=%E6%8D%90%E8%B4%88%E4%BD%9C%E5%93%81

Year of birth missing (living people)
Living people
Hong Kong painters
Hong Kong women artists